Stephanie Wood (born 28 November 1991), also known as Steph Wood, is an Australia netball international. Wood was a member of the Australia teams that won the silver medals at the 2018 Commonwealth Games and at the 2019 Netball World Cup. Between 2015 and 2016, Wood played for New South Wales Swifts in the ANZ Championship. Since 2017 she has played for Sunshine Coast Lightning in Suncorp Super Netball. Between 2015 and 2019, she featured in five successive grand finalist squads, winning premierships with Sunshine Coast Lightning in 2017 and 2018.

Early life and family
Wood was born in Hyde Park, Queensland. Her family moved around because her father served in the Australian Defence Force. The family eventually settled in Brisbane and Brendale. She is the  youngest of three girls. Her two older sisters, Jodie and Tracey, also played netball.

Playing career

Early years
Wood started playing netball when she was six and was playing in division one with the 
Pine Rivers Netball Association when she was twelve. She represented Queensland  at under-17, under-19 and under-21 levels. In 2010 she captained the under-19 team to an Australian National Netball Championships title and was named Tournament MVP. Her shooting partner was Ameliaranne Wells. Wood also played for both Suncoast Lynx and Carina Tigers in the Queensland State Netball League.

Queensland Fusion
Between 2009 and 2014, Wood played for Queensland Fusion in the Australian Netball League. In 2014 she was a member of the Fusion team that finished as runners up in the ANL. She was also named the 2014 Queensland Fusion MVP. While playing for Fusion, Wood was also called up as a replacement player for Queensland Firebirds during the 2012 ANZ Championship season. However she never made a senior appearance for Firebirds.

Australian Institute of Sport
Between 2010 and 2011, Wood played for the Australian Institute of Sport. In 2011 she won the Gweneth Benzie Award for the best player in the program.

New South Wales Swifts
In 2014 Wood signed for New South Wales Swifts. She subsequently made her ANZ Championship debut with Swifts in a 2015 Round 2 match against Waikato Bay of Plenty Magic. During 2015, Wood played for NNSW Waratahs in the Australian Netball League. Wood played for Swifts in two successive grand finals in 2015 and 2016. However, on both occasions they won to Queensland Firebirds.

Sunshine Coast Lightning
Since 2017, Wood has played for Sunshine Coast Lightning in Suncorp Super Netball. Together with Caitlin Bassett, she was one of the first players to join the new franchise. Wood was a member of the Lighting teams that won the 2017 and 2018 Suncorp Super Netball titles. In 2018 she was named Lightning's Members' Player of the Year. She also shared the main MVP award with Karla Pretorius.

Australia
Wood made her senior debut for Australia on 27 August 2016 against South Africa during the 2016 Netball Quad Series. She had previously represented Australia at under-19 and under-21 levels. Wood was subsequently a member of the Australia teams that won the silver medals at the 2018 Commonwealth Games and at the 2019 Netball World Cup.

Honours
Australia
Netball Quad Series
Winners: 2016, 2018 (September), 2019, 2022, 2023
Netball World Cup
Runners Up: 2019
Commonwealth Games
Winners: 2022
Runners Up: 2018
Sunshine Coast Lightning
Suncorp Super Netball
Winners: 2017, 2018
Runners Up: 2019 
New South Wales Swifts
ANZ Championship
Runners Up: 2015, 2016
Queensland Fusion
Australian Netball League
Runners up: 2014: 1
Queensland
Australian National Netball Championships
Winners: Under-19 (2010)

References

 

1991 births
Living people
Australia international netball players
Australian netball players
Netball players from Queensland
Netball players at the 2018 Commonwealth Games
Commonwealth Games medallists in netball
Commonwealth Games silver medallists for Australia
Netball players at the 2022 Commonwealth Games
Commonwealth Games gold medallists for Australia
2019 Netball World Cup players
Queensland Fusion players
Netball New South Wales Waratahs players
Australian Institute of Sport netball players
New South Wales Swifts players
Sunshine Coast Lightning players
ANZ Championship players
Suncorp Super Netball players
Australian Netball League players
Queensland state netball league players
New South Wales state netball league players
Medallists at the 2018 Commonwealth Games
Medallists at the 2022 Commonwealth Games